The Canon PowerShot TX1 is a Canon digital camera. It was released on February 22, 2007 The TX1 is a hybrid device designed for both still imagery and video recording. It offers both HDTV (1280×720 pixel, 30 frame/s) movie capture, as well as 10× stabilized zoom and 7.1 megapixel sensor.  It is designed to improve upon hybrid offerings by competitors such as the Sony Cyber-shot M1, Sony Cyber-shot M2, and Pentax MX4. It is oriented vertically and uses the camcorder-like swivel LCD viewing screen.  Canon compares the hybrid camera's size to that of the Canon ELPH series of cameras.  The company distinguishes the camera for its optical image stabilizer technology, DIGIC III image processor, face detection technology and red-eye effect correction with a mention of its built-in lens cover and scratch-resistant, anti-reflective LCD screen.

Reviews 
On its release it was termed the most expensive ultra zoom (10–12×) camera on the market. It is relatively small ( ×  × ) and as a hybrid camera it includes a combination of features that was a fairly revolutionary for digital photography at the time of release.  Although most digital cameras now offer both still image and video capabilities, few offer advanced levels of both such as ultra zoom and HDTV.  This was Canon's first attempt at such a hybrid.  The combination has not been highly regarded by reviewers and editors, but users were highly satisfied with the combination. Due to its weak sales, there was no successor model.

Headline features 

The following are the most important features:
 Vertical design
 1/2.5-inch 7.1 million pixel CCD
 Vari-angle LCD monitor (1.8-inch)
 10× optical (39–390 mm equiv.) zoom lens — 12 elements (one UD and one aspheric element)
 Optical image stabilization
 ISO 80–1600
 DIGIC III and face detection
 720p (1280×720) movies at 30 frame/s with stereo sound
 1080i component video output
 Flexible movie/still shooting. Shoot a full-resolution still image during movie recording, or start movie recording by pressing the record button

New features 
The following are considered new features:
 Vertical design
 Vari-angle LCD monitor
 Lens totally hidden when power off
 Wide-range, compact zoom
 Image stabilization
 7.1 million pixel CCD sensor
 Auto ISO shift
 Selectable aspect ratio
 Auto red eye correction
 Digic III processor
 Windows Vista OS compatibility
 Expanded SD card compatibility
 Wide-screen setting
 Flexible movie, still shooting
 Continuous recording up to 4 GB
 Continuous audio-only recording
 "Component" output to HDTVs
 Face detection system
 Shutter speed/aperture read-out
 Read-out of ISO
 Digital tele-converter
 Safety zoom
 Time lapse movie feature
 AC adapter kit ACK-DC10
 High-power flash HF-DC1

Notes

External links 

Canon PowerShot TX1: Digital Photography Review
Unofficial TX1 forums:

TX1